North Macedonia, officially the Republic of North Macedonia, is a country in the Balkan Peninsula in Southeast Europe. It is one of the successor states of the former Yugoslavia, from which it declared independence in September 1991 under the name Republic of Macedonia.

Some ambassadors to North Macedonia are responsible for more than one country, while others are directly accredited to its capital, Skopje.

Current Ambassadors to North Macedonia

See also
 Foreign relations of North Macedonia
 List of diplomatic missions of North Macedonia
 List of diplomatic missions in North Macedonia

References
  Diplomatic List

 
North Macedonia